Erjavecia is a monotypic genus of gastropods belonging to the family Clausiliidae. The only species is Erjavecia bergeri.

The species is found in near Alps.

References

Clausiliidae